The John Mason House is a historic First Period house in Lexington, Massachusetts. It is a -story wood-frame structure, its main block three bays wide, with a side-gable roof, clapboard siding, and two chimneys set behind the roof ridge. A leanto section to the rear gives it a saltbox profile, and an ell extends to the right.  The oldest portion of the house, a three-bay portion of its main block, was built circa 1715. The building has been repeatedly extended and altered over the years. John Mason, its builder, was a prominent local citizen.

The house was listed on the National Register of Historic Places in 1990.

See also
National Register of Historic Places listings in Middlesex County, Massachusetts

References

Houses completed in 1715
Houses on the National Register of Historic Places in Middlesex County, Massachusetts
Houses in Lexington, Massachusetts
1715 establishments in Massachusetts